The Trofeul Popeci was a tournament for professional female tennis players played on outdoor clay courts. The event was classified as a $50,000+H ITF Women's Circuit tournament. It was annually held in Craiova, Romania, from 2007 to 2013. From 2007 until 2010 the tournament was classified as a $10,000 event on the ITF calendar. The last edition of the tournament was in 2013.

Past finals

Singles

Doubles

References

External links 
 Official website 
 ITF search

ITF Women's World Tennis Tour
Clay court tennis tournaments
Tennis tournaments in Romania
Recurring sporting events established in 2007
Recurring sporting events disestablished in 2013
Defunct sports competitions in Romania